Box 25 is a 2015 Panamanian documentary film directed by Mercedes Arias and Delfina Vidal. The film is about letters that were written by the men who built the Panama Canal.

It was originally reported to be the Panamanian entry for the Best Foreign Language Film at the 88th Academy Awards. However, when the final list was announced by the Academy, the film was not included.

See also
 List of submissions to the 88th Academy Awards for Best Foreign Language Film
 List of Panamanian submissions for the Academy Award for Best Foreign Language Film

References

External links
 

2015 films
2015 documentary films
Panamanian documentary films
2010s Spanish-language films
Films shot in Panama
Panama Canal
Documentary films about historical events